The Auckland derby was a local football rivalry between two New Zealand Football Championship clubs based in the Auckland Region. Auckland City FC are located within Auckland City itself while Waitakere United are from neighbouring city Waitakere City. Since November 2010, the two cities are now part of the new super city; Auckland Council and the rivalry can now be classed as a city derby.
Since the creation of the New Zealand Football Championship in 2004 the two clubs have dominated the league becoming the only sides to win the Premiership and the end of season playoffs. As a result of their dominance they have been annually awarded 2 places in the same group of the OFC Champions League adding a further two derby games to the calendar. It is also known as the Super City Derby. With the change of structure of football in New Zealand at the start of 2021, and the creation of the new New Zealand National League, this saw the end of Waitakere United, and consequently the end of the Auckland Derby.

All-time results

Head to head

Leading scorers

Titles by club

References

Auckland derby (Game list reference)

External links 
Auckland City official website
Waitakere United official website 

Association football in New Zealand
Association football rivalries
Sports rivalries in New Zealand
Sport in Auckland
2007 establishments in New Zealand